Pehelvan Kikkar Singh Sandhu (January 13, 1857 – February 18, 1914) was born in a Sandhu Jat family. He was a  wrestler from Lahore, British India (now Pakistan).

Life 
Singh was born to wrestler Javala Singh Sandhu and Sahib Kaur. His parents were farmers of moderate means in the village of Ghanienke, Lahore district (now in Pakistan). Singh trained as a wrestler in his mother's native village, Nurpur, under the village potter, before returning to Ghanienke to continue training with wrestler Vasava Sing.

Singh was already a popular wrestler when he started his tutelage under Buta Pahilvan, Rustam-i-Hind, of Lahore. Singh developed world class skill, and eventually became the leading Indian wrestler. He enjoyed the patronage of the rulers of the princely states of Jodhpur, Indore, Dasuya, Tonk and Jammu and Kashmir.

There are several theories on why he came to be known as Kikkar Singh. One theory is that he once uprooted a kikkar tree (acacia) with his bare hands. Another states that he earned his botanical name due to his extraordinary height and dark complexion, which were uncommon for the time.

Kikkar Singh fought and won many bouts during his lifetime. In fact, there were not many competitors to match his strength and skill. However, he lost the last bout of his life. During the Delhi Durbar, held in December 1911 to celebrate the coronation of King George V, Singh was challenged by a younger wrestler and an old rival, Kallu of Amritsar. Singh, at 54, was long past his prime and already asthmatic, but he would not let the challenge go unanswered. He put up a considerable fight to the delight of the elite gathering (Maharaja Bhupinder Singh of Patiala and Sardul Singh Caveeshar were among the spectators), but lost. To many eyewitnesses it appeared to be a dubious judgement.

Kikkar Singh died on 18 February 1914 in his native village, where a samadhi or memorial shrine has been raised in his memory.

Bibliography
Joban Sandhu,  The Encyclopedia of Sikhism

References

External links
https://web.archive.org/web/20090917100751/http://www.allaboutsikhs.com/1800/kikkar-singh-pahilvan.html
https://web.archive.org/web/20110604004544/http://www.jattworld.com/portal/modules/mysections/article.php?lid=44

People from British India
1857 births
1914 deaths